Rhynchaeites is an extinct genus of Threskiornithidae related to modern ibises and has a single named species Rhynchaeites meselensis. It lived in today's Germany during the mid-Eocene and its remains were found in the famous Messel pit.

However, leg bone fossils of a similar bird were found in the Early Eocene Fur Formation in Denmark. It has been hypothesized that the supposed parrot relative Mopsitta tanta, known from a single humerus bone, is the same bird as the leg fossils and thus actually belongs in Rhynchaeites too.

References 
"The Origin and Evolution of Birds" by Alan Feduccia

Eocene birds
†
Extinct birds of Europe
Fur Formation